South Korean singer Taeyang began his career as the main vocalist of the K-Pop and hip-hop group Big Bang. His first solo single was "My Girl", included in BigBang's debut album Big Bang Vol.1 (2006). His first extended play, Hot (2008) yielded the chart-topper single "Only Look at Me". His first full-length album, Solar was released in July 2010 and became the first by an Asian artist to top iTunes charts in North America, in addition to peaking atop the Gaon Albums Chart.

Taeyang followed up with the release of his second studio album Rise in June 2014, which became the highest-charting album on the American Billboard 200 among solo Korean artists at the time it was released, while its lead-single, "Eyes, Nose, Lips", became the second best-performing single of 2014 in South Korea. His third album, White Night, was released in August 2017.


Albums

Studio albums

Extended plays

Singles

As lead artist

Promotional singles

As featured artist

Other charted songs

Songwriting credits 
All song credits are adapted from the Korea Music Copyright Association's database, unless otherwise noted.

Solo work

Work as Big Bang

Other artists

Videography

Music videos

Video album

See also 
 Big Bang discography
 GD X Taeyang discography

Notes 

 A  Prior to the issue date of August 25, 2011, the K-Pop Hot 100 did not exist. Singles had previously charted exclusively on the Gaon Digital Chart.
 B  The Gaon Music Chart began releasing data in 2010 after the Music Industry Association of Korea stopped compiling data in 2008. Online sources for charts prior to January 2010 are currently unavailable.
 C  Another version of "Eyes, Nose, Lips", credited to Epik High featuring TaeYang, reached No. 12 on Billboard World Digital Songs.

References 

Taeyang
Discographies of South Korean artists